Luís de Almeida served as the Angolan government's top diplomat to Europe during the 1980s, at one point specifically as ambassador to France.

See also
Angola-France relations

References

External links
Article on November 2008 appointment 

Living people
Year of birth missing (living people)
Ambassadors of Angola to France
Angolan diplomats